In chemistry, dynamic stereochemistry studies the effect of stereochemistry on the reaction rate of a chemical reaction. Stereochemistry is involved in:
 stereospecific reactions 
 stereoselective or asymmetric reactions
 racemisation processes

References 
 Carey, Francis A.; Sundberg, Richard J.; (1984). Advanced Organic Chemistry Part A Structure and Mechanisms (2nd ed.). New York N.Y.: Plenum Press .

Stereochemistry
Chemical kinetics